Pandigai is a 2017 Indian Tamil-language action thriller film written and directed by debutant Feroz and produced by his wife Vijayalakshmi Ahathian. The film stars Krishna and Anandhi, while Saravanan, Pandi, Karunas, Madhusudhan Rao, and Arjai play supporting roles. The music was composed by R. H. Vikram with cinematography by Aravind. The film released on 14 July 2017.

Plot 
Velu is a waiter at a holiday resort in Chennai. He just wants to make enough money to pay for his working permit to work abroad. However, he has had a traumatic childhood. After the death of his parents, his uncle and aunt sent him to boarding school, where he is initially bullied. In order to survive in the new, harsh environment, he learns to fight to protect himself. As a young adult, he moves to the city to start a new life. As poor, single, and young men, Velu and his roommate, Tirupathi, face many hardships in the city. They eventually meet Muni, an agent for an underground fight club. After seeing Velu win a fight at a bar, Muni introduces him to the ruthless owner of the fight club, Natwar Dada. Velu slowly rises up the ranks and becomes one of the city's best underground fighters. Velu then meets a girl named Kavya and plans to stop fighting in order to be with her, but first, he needs to make enough money to escape his current life. Velu also needs money to get his house back. Together, they hatch a plan to rig Velu's next fight with Victor, the city's top underground fighter. However, things do not quite turn out as planned.

Cast 

 Krishna as Velu
 Anandhi as Kavya
 Saravanan as Muni
 Pandi as Tirupathi
 Karunas as Rattinam Kumar / Elango
 Madhusudhan Rao as Natwar Dada
 Arjai as Victor
 Nithin Sathya as Mundhiri Settu
 Aruldoss as Feeling Suresh
 Shanmugarajan as Police Officer
 Senthi Kumari as Muni's wife
 Lokesh as Pandi
 Aathma Patrick

Production 
The makers of the film initially narrated the script to Vikram Prabhu, but his unavailability meant that Krishna was signed on to play the lead role, with Nithin Sathya and Karunas selected to essay supporting roles. Pandigai began shoot in early June 2015, with Anandhi added to the cast to play the heroine. Nithin Sathya essays the role of Mundhiri Settu. Release of this movie is postponed from 7 July 2017 to a week later 14 July 2017.

Soundtrack

Release 
The satellite rights of the film were sold to Vasanth TV. Baradwaj Rangan of Film Companion wrote "Midway, Pandigai changes genre. It becomes a heist movie. Instead of settling down with the (oft-told) story of a fighter, why not give us the (oft-shown) mechanics of a heist? Double the genre and halve the clichés."

References

External links
 

2010s Tamil-language films
Indian boxing films
2017 films
Indian action thriller films
2017 directorial debut films
2017 action thriller films